Sandra Dingli (born 1952) is a Maltese philosopher mostly specialised in Creative Thinking.

Life
Dingli was born at Paceville, Malta, in 1952. She started attending philosophy and language courses at the University of Malta, and later proceeding to graduate courses at the same university. Here go acquired a Bachelor of Arts and a Masters in Philosophy, and proceeded to obtain a Doctorate in Philosophy from Durham University in England.

Her breakthrough came in 1992 when she was appointed the Director of the ‘Edward de Bono Institute for the Design & Development of Thinking’ at the University of Malta. This gave her the golden opportunity of show her colour as an international organiser and as a philosopher. She is still currently Director of the said institution, and teaches at the University of Malta.

Works
Book

 2005 – On Thinking and the World'. This is a 218-page work published by Ashgate Publishing Limited, England in which Dingli selects five particular contemporary philosophical topics which John McDowell deals with and investigates in detail the implications of particular points of view, analysing the current literature on each topic and drawing out shortcomings and possibilities for overcoming them. The work is both a critique and a complement to McDowell’s text.

Published editions

Dingli is also the editor of a number of published books, namely:
 1994 - Creative Thinking: A Multifaceted Approach 1996 - Creative Thinking: New Perspectives 1998 - Creative Thinking: Towards Broader Horizons 2002 - Creative Thinking: An Indispensable Asset for a Successful Future 2007 – Creative Thinking: Designing Future Possibilities''

Chapters in books

The following are a selection of Dingli’s published chapters in books:
 1999 - ‘Creativity in Practice at the University of Malta’.
 2002 - ‘Let’s Shake the Apple Tree: Creative Thinking at the University of Malta’.
 2005 - ‘Organisational Creativity and Innovation: Crisis Management or Sustainable Development’.
 2006 - ‘A Plea for Responsibility towards the Common Heritage of Mankind’.
 2007 - ‘Quality Television for Children in 2015’ (with J. Casingena Harper).
 2007 - ‘Reflections on the Creative Climate’.
 2008 - ‘Lateral Thinking: Thinking Out of the Box’.
 2009 - ‘Children, Media and Multitasking’ (with S. Pulis Xerxen).

See also
Philosophy in Malta

References

21st-century Maltese philosophers
20th-century Maltese philosophers
Maltese educational theorists
1952 births
Living people
People from St. Julian's, Malta
University of Malta alumni
Alumni of Durham University
Academic staff of the University of Malta